Józef Berkowicz also known as Joseph Berkovitz or Berkowitz (born in 1789 in Praga, died in 1846 in Liverpool) was a Polish military officer of Jewish origin, the only son of Berek Joselewicz.

He took part in the 1809 Battle of Kock, Napoleon's invasion of Russia in 1812 and in the 1830 November Uprising against the Russian Empire. On 21 December 1830 he issued a call to the Polish Jews to support the fight for Polish independence. Berkowicz was an organizer of the Jewish unit of the National Guard composed of 850 Jewish volunteers. According to Guesnet François of University Potsdam, only 100 Jewish volunteers responded to his appeal. Berkowicz was wounded on various occasions and earned two military awards of valor.

From 1832 to 1836 Berkowicz lived in exile in France, and in 1837 he settled permanently in England, where he died ten years later.

He is the author of the novel "Stanislaus or the Polish Lancer in the Suite of Napoleon, from the Island of Elbe.", published in 1846 in the UK.

See also
Leon Berkowicz
November Uprising
Stanislas Hernisz
Jewish City Guard
Battle of Warsaw (1831)

References

18th-century Polish Jews
Polish commanders of the Napoleonic Wars
Polish Army officers
1789 births
1846 deaths
November Uprising participants
Military personnel from Warsaw
Writers from Warsaw
Activists of the Great Emigration
Polish emigrants to France
Jewish military personnel